Montepuez District is a district of Cabo Delgado Province in northern Mozambique. It seat lies at Montepuez town.

External links
Government profile 

Districts in Cabo Delgado Province